The 1920 Georgia Tech Golden Tornado baseball team represented the Georgia Tech Golden Tornado of the Georgia Institute of Technology in the 1920 NCAA baseball season.

Schedule and results

References

Georgia Tech Golden Tornado
Georgia Tech Yellow Jackets baseball seasons
Southern Intercollegiate Athletic Association baseball champion seasons
Georgia Tech
1920s in Atlanta